The 2017–18 Croatian Football Cup was the twenty-seventh season of Croatia's football knockout competition. The defending champions were Rijeka, having won their fourth title the previous year by defeating Dinamo Zagreb in the final.

Calendar

Participating clubs
The following 48 teams qualified for the competition:

Preliminary round
The draw for the preliminary single-legged round was held on 20 July 2017 in Zagreb. The matches were played on 23 August 2017.

* Matches played on 19 August.** Matches played on 22 August.

First round
The first round was played on 20 September 2017.

* Match played on 19 September.
** Matches played on 4 October.
*** Match played on 18 October.

Second round
The second round was played on 25 October 2017.

* Match played on 24 October.
** Match played on 31 October.
*** Match played on 7 November.
**** Match played on 14 November.

Quarter-finals
The quarter-final was played on 29 November 2017.

* Match played on 30 November.
** Match played on 13 December at Stadion Rujevica in Rijeka due to inadequate pitch condition at ŠRC Zaprešić.

Semi-finals
The semi-final was originally scheduled for 28 February 2018 but was later postponed due to unfavourable weather conditions.

Final

The final was played on 23 May 2018 at Stadion HNK Cibalia in Vinkovci.

Bracket

Top scorers

References

External links
Official website 
Competition rules 

Croatian Football Cup seasons
Croatia
Croatian Cup, 2017-18